Lillehammer is a municipality in Innlandet county, Norway. It is located in the traditional district of Gudbrandsdal. The administrative centre of the municipality is the town of Lillehammer. Some of the more notable villages in the municipality include Fåberg, Hunderfossen, Jørstadmoen, Vingnes, and Vingrom.

The  municipality is the 211th largest by area out of the 356 municipalities in Norway. Lillehammer is the 38th most populous municipality in Norway with a population of 28,425.

The town of Lillehammer is the largest urban centre in the municipality. It lies in the central part of the municipality and it is surrounded by more rural areas. The town centre is a late nineteenth-century concentration of wooden houses, which enjoys a picturesque location overlooking the northern part of lake Mjøsa and the river Lågen, surrounded by mountains. Lillehammer hosted the 1994 Winter Olympics and 2016 Winter Youth Olympics.

General information
The municipality was established on 1 January 1838 (see formannskapsdistrikt law). On 1 January 1906, a small adjacent area of the neighboring municipality of Fåberg (population: 140) was annexed by Lillehammer to make room for more expansion as the town grew. During the 1960s, there were many municipal mergers across Norway due to the work of the Schei Committee. On 1 January 1964, the town of Lillehammer (population: 5,905) was merged with Fåberg Municipality (population: 13,381) to form a new, larger Lillehammer Municipality.

Name
The municipality (originally the parish) was named after the old Hamar farm, since the first Lillehammer Church was built there. The name is identical with the word hamarr which means "rocky hill". To distinguish it from the nearby town of Hamar and Diocese of Hamar, it began to be called "little Hamar": Lilþlæ Hamar and Litlihamarr, and finally Lillehammer. It is also mentioned in the Old Norse sagas as Litlikaupangr ("Little Trading Place").

Coat of arms
The coat of arms was granted on 4 April 1898. The arms depict a birkebeiner, carrying a spear and a shield, who is skiing down a silver/white mountainside under a blue sky. The design symbolizes the historical importance of when the Birkebeiners carried the future King Haakon from Lillehammer to Rena on skis.

Churches

The Church of Norway has six parishes within the municipality of Lillehammer. It is part of the Sør-Gudbrandsdal prosti (deanery) in the Diocese of Hamar.

History
The village of Lillehammer is located at the northern end of Norway's largest lake, Mjøsa. There have likely been settlements here since the Iron Age and the market here was mentioned in Håkon Håkonson's saga in 1390. It is also mentioned as a site for Thing assembly in 1390. Tradition states that it was here in Lillehammer where the birkebeiners Torstein Skjevla and Skjervald Skrukka joined up with the King's son (and future King), Haakon, in 1205 before they traveled to Østerdalen (an event which is commemorated in March every year to this day). Since medieval times, the Lillehammer Church has been located here.

The village was granted market town rights on 7 August 1827. At that time, 50 people lived within the boundaries of the newly established town. This site was chosen because there were no other towns in all of Christians amt (county) and this site was located along the Gudbrandsdalslågen river and the whole Gudbrandsdal valley was a major transportation route from the capital to northern Norway. Within two years of the establishment of the town, the population had risen to 360 people. The merchant Ludvig Wiese has been counted as the founder of the town (a statue of him was erected in the town in connection with the town's 100th anniversary in 1927). The laying of the main railway line from the capital in Christiania to Eidsvoll was completed in 1852. This railway line was connected with steamships along the lake Mjøsa which travelled to Lillehammer and from there a newly laid road made connections further up into the Gudbrandsdalen valley. This transport system made the transit of timber and agricultural goods from all over the county to the capital possible, and it contributed to the growth of the town of Lillehammer.

In 1973, Mossad killed a Moroccan waiter, having mistaken him for Palestinian terrorist Ali Hassan Salameh, which became known as the Lillehammer affair.

Lillehammer is known as a typical venue for winter sporting events; it was host city of the 1994 Winter Olympics, and the 2016 Winter Youth Olympics, and was part of a joint bid with applicant host city Oslo to host events part of the 2022 Winter Olympics until Oslo withdrew its bid on 1 October 2014.

Lillehammer is home to the largest literature festival in the Nordic countries and, in 2017, was designated as a UNESCO City of Literature.

Education
A number of schools are located in Lillehammer, including the Hammartun Primary and Lower Secondary School, Søre Ål Primary School and Kringsjå Primary and Lower Secondary School. Lillehammer Upper Secondary School consists of two branches, North and South, both situated near the city center. The private high school Norwegian College of Elite Sports, NTG, also has a branch in Lillehammer. The Lillehammer campus of Inland Norway University of Applied Sciences is situated just north of the town itself.

Lillehammer is also the home of the Nansen Academy - the Norwegian Humanistic Academy. The Nansen Academy is an educational institution for adult students with varied political, religious, and cultural backgrounds. The Academy was founded on the core principles of humanism and aims at strengthening the knowledge of these principles.

The 14th World Scout Jamboree was held from 29 July to 7 August 1975 and was hosted by Norway at Lillehammer.

Government
All municipalities in Norway, including Lillehammer, are responsible for primary education (through 10th grade), outpatient health services, senior citizen services, unemployment and other social services, zoning, economic development, and municipal roads.  The municipality is governed by a municipal council of elected representatives, which in turn elects a mayor.  The municipality falls under the Vestre Innlandet District Court and the Eidsivating Court of Appeal.

Municipal council
The municipal council  of Lillehammer is made up of 47 representatives that are elected to four year terms.  The party breakdown of the council is as follows:

Mayors
The mayors of Lillehammer (incomplete list):

1946–1954: Einar Hansen, (Ap)
1954–1959: Anton Andreassen, (Ap)
1960–1963: Erling Juell Aune, (Ap)
1964–1975: Magne Henriksen, (Ap)
1976–1981: Knut Korsæth, (Ap)
1982–1987: Arild Bakken, (Ap)
1987–1999: Audun Tron, (Ap)
1999–2011: Synnøve Brenden Klemetrud, (Ap)
2011–2019: Espen Johnsen, (Ap)
2019–present: Ingunn Trosholmen, (Ap)

Geography
Lillehammer is situated in the lower part of the Gudbrandsdal valley, at the northern end of lake Mjøsa. It is located to the south of Øyer Municipality, to the southeast of Gausdal Municipality, northeast of Nordre Land Municipality, to the north of Gjøvik Municipality, and to the southeast of Ringsaker Municipality. The mountain Nevelfjell lies in the northeast part of the municipality.

Climate 
Lillehammer has a humid continental climate (Köppen: Dfb) and used to have a subarctic climate (Köppen: Dfc), with the Scandinavian mountain chain to the west and north limiting oceanic influences. There has been no overnight air frost in the month of August since 1978 with the record low for that month being . The average date for the last overnight freeze (low below ) in spring is May 10 and average date for first freeze in autumn is September 30 (1981-2010 average) giving an average frost-free season of 142 days. The current weather station Lillehammer-Sætherengen became operational in 1982; extremes are also from two earlier weather stations in Lillehammer.

Populated places
Lillehammer Municipality is subdivided into the following populated places (i.e.: neighborhoods, quarters, villages, localities, settlements, communities, hamlets, etc.):

 Søre Ål
 Nordre Ål
 Lillehammer Centre
 Nybu
 Vårsetergrenda
 Røyslimoen
 Vingnes
 Jørstadmoen
 Fåberg
 Rudsbygd
 Saksumdal
 Vingrom
 Nordseter
 Hovemoen
 Busmoen

Economy
The basis for the economy of the municipality is its position as the northernmost point of the lake Mjøsa and as the gateway for the Gudbrandsdal region, through which the historical highway from Oslo to Trondheim passes. The Mesna river has provided the basis for several small industries through the years, but Lillehammer is now all but industry-less. –

Media

Transport
One of the major Norwegian rail lines, the Dovre Line, runs from Hamar to the north through Lillehammer on its way up the Gudbrandsdal valley, to terminate in the city of Trondheim. The European route E6 highway also passes through Lillehammer.

Attractions

In addition to the Olympic site, Lillehammer offers a number of other tourist attractions:

 Maihaugen, centrally located in Lillehammer, is the largest open-air museum in Norway, with 185 buildings, mostly from Lillehammer and the valley of Gudbrandsdalen.
Garmo Stave Church (built around 1150)
 The Norwegian Olympic Museum is the only museum in Northern Europe that shows the whole Olympic history from the ancient times and up to today, including all Summer- and Winter games. The museum also houses the Norwegian Sports Hall of Fame and a special section about the Lillehammer `94 Olympic Winter games. The Museum is located in the indoor museum at Maihaugen.
Lillehammer Art Museum
Hafjell (Ski resort  from Lillehammer, host of slalom and super-G in the Olympic games 1994)
Kvitfjell (Ski resort  from Lillehammer, host of downhill in the Olympic games 1994)
 The PS Skibladner is the world's oldest paddle steamer in scheduled service, launched in 1856. Summer sailings around lake Mjøsa: Lillehammer, Moelv, Gjøvik, Hamar, and Eidsvoll.
 The ski jump at Lysgårdsbakkene.
 The sculpture Mothership with Standing Matter by Antony Gormley in a pavilion by Snøhetta architects close to Lillehammer Station.

Sport

Sports clubs
 Lillehammer Ishockeyklubb (The team competes in Norway's major hockey league, the GET-League.)
 Lillehammer Innabandy Klubb
 Lillehammer Orienteringsklubb
 Lillehammer Skiklubb
 Lillehammer Fotballklubb
 Lillehammer Frisbee
 Roterud Idrettslag

Notable residents

Arts 
 Kalle Løchen (1865–1893) a Norwegian painter and actor
 Sigrid Undset (1882–1949) a novelist, awarded the Nobel Prize for Literature in 1928; lived at her home "Bjerkebæk" in Lillehammer from 1919 to 1940 and again after WWII.
 Odd Grythe (1918–1995) a Norwegian radio and TV personality
 Kjell Lund (1927–2013) a Norwegian architect, songwriter and singer
 Sveinung Hovensjø (born 1950) a Norwegian jazz musician, plays bass and guitar
 Kristin Sevaldsen (born 1966) a jazz musician (saxophone), composer, and music producer
 Atle Antonsen (born 1969) a Norwegian comic and actor, was born in Lillehammer 
 Ingrid Olava (born 1981) a Norwegian singer and musician, born and grew up in Lillehammer

Public service 

 Lars Olsen Skrefsrud (1840–1910) a Lutheran missionary in India
 Johan Lunde (1866–1938) a theologian and bishop of the Diocese of Oslo
 Ulrik Frederik Lange (1808–1878) educator and mayor of Lillehammer 1840s & 50s
 Margit Haslund (1885–1963) a women's advocate and mayor of Lillehammer in 1940
 Thor Bjørklund (1889–1975) an inventor, invented the Ostehøvel, a popular cheese slicer
 Anne Stine Ingstad (1918–1997) an archaeologist, discovered Norse remains in Canada
 Kai Holst (1913–1945) a seaman, fur farmer and resistance fighter during WWII
 Nils Slaatto (1922–2001) a prominent and influential Norwegian architect
 Egil Tynæs (1941–2004) an anthroposophical physician, died in Afghanistan
 Bjørn Simensen (born 1947) director, Norwegian National Opera 1984/1990 & 1997/2009
 Torkil Damhaug (born 1958) a Norwegian physician and crime fiction writer

Sport 

 Ove Nielsen (born 1924) Danish rower, competed at 1952 Summer Olympics lives locally
 Petter Belsvik (born 1967) a football coach and former player with 383 club caps
 Jon Inge Høiland (born 1977) a former footballer with 396 club caps and 25 for Norway
 Anita Rapp (born 1977) a footballer and team gold medallist at the 2000 Summer Olympics
 Grete Eliassen (born 1986) an American-Norwegian freestyle skier
 Edvald Boasson Hagen (born 1987) a Norwegian professional road racing cyclist
 Robert Johansson (born 1990) a ski jumper with two bronze and a team gold medal at the 2018 Winter Olympics
 Robert Lee (born 2001) a ski jumper

In popular culture
 The Norwegian-American Netflix original series Lilyhammer takes place in Lillehammer. The show stars Steven Van Zandt, who plays Frank "the Fixer" Tagliano, a New York mobster who moves to Lillehammer through the U.S. Witness Protection Program after being inspired by the 1994 Winter Olympics to relocate to Norway.
 Toki Wartooth, the fictional guitarist from the Adult Swim TV show Metalocalypse, was born and raised here.

Twin towns – sister cities

Lillehammer has sister city agreements with the following places:

 Autrans-Méaudre-en-Vercors, France
 Hayward, United States
 Hørsholm, Denmark
 Leksand, Sweden
 Minamiuonuma, Japan
 Oberhof, Germany
 Oulainen, Finland

Friendly cities
Lillehammer has also friendly relations with:
 Düsseldorf, Germany
 Minakami, Japan
 Radviliškis, Lithuania
 Sarajevo, Bosnia and Herzegovina

See also
European Youth Parliament
Junior Eurovision Song Contest 2004
St. Mary Church, Lillehammer

References

External links

Municipal fact sheet from Statistics Norway 

Lillehammer Tourist Office
Gudbrandsdalen Region
Inland Norway University of Applied Sciences
Lillehammer Icehockey Club  
Olympic Park in Lillehammer
Pictures from the Olympic games in 1994¨
Norwegian Olympic Museum

 
Municipalities of Innlandet
1838 establishments in Norway
Ski areas and resorts in Norway